Taractrocera luzonensis is a butterfly of the family Hesperiidae. It is found from south-western Burma and northern Thailand through Malaysia, Sumatra, Borneo and the Philippines to Sulawesi and neighbouring islands.

The length of the forewings is 10.1-12.1 mm.

Subspecies
Taractrocera luzonensis luzonensis (the Philippines)
Taractrocera luzonensis zenia Evans, 1934 (southern Burma, southern Thailand)
Taractrocera luzonensis tissara Fruhstorfer, 1910 (Sumatra and islands to the west)
Taractrocera luzonensis stella Evans, 1934 (Borneo and nearby islands)
Taractrocera luzonensis dongola Evans, 1932 (Sulawesi and Sula Archipelago)
Taractrocera luzonensis bessa Evans, 1949 (islands to the south of Sulawesi (Salayar, Tukanbesi, Tanahjampea) and probably also in southern Sulawesi)

External links
Phylogeny and biogeography of the genus Taractrocera Butler, 1870 (Lepidoptera: Hesperiidae), an example of Southeast Asian-Australian interchange
A note on three species of Taractrocera Butler (Lepidoptera: Hesperiidae)

Taractrocerini
Butterflies described in 1889